HMS Falmouth was a 50-gun fourth-rate ship of the line built for the Royal Navy in the first decade of the 18th century. The ship participated in several battles during the War of the Spanish Succession (1701–15) and the War of Jenkins' Ear (1739–48).

Description
The ship's tonnage was 700  tons burthen. Officially rated at 50 guns, her armament consisted of 22 twelve-pounder guns on the lower gundeck and 22 six-pounder guns on the upper deck. On the quarterdeck were 8 six-pounder guns with another pair on the forecastle. The ship had a crew of 185–280 officers and ratings.

The ship's tonnage was 760  tons burthen. Her armament was upgraded and now consisted of 22 eighteen-pounder guns on the lower gundeck and 22 nine-pounder guns on the upper deck. The number of six-pounder guns on the quarterdeck was reduced to four, but the pair on the forecastle were retained. The ship now had a crew of 280 officers and ratings.

Construction and career
Falmouth was the third ship in the Royal Navy to be named after the eponymous port. Built to the 1706 Establishment design, the ship was ordered on 8 February 1707. She was built at Woolwich Dockyard under the direction of Master Shipwright Richard Stacey, and was launched on 26 February 1708

On 14 May 1724 Falmouth was ordered to be taken to pieces and rebuilt according to the 1719 Establishment at Woolwich Dockyard, from where she was relaunched on 3 April 1729.

Notes

References

Lavery, Brian (2003) The Ship of the Line - Volume 1: The Development of the Battlefleet 1650–1850. Conway Maritime Press. .
Winfield, Rif (2009) British Warships in the Age of Sail 1603–1714: Design, Construction, Careers and Fates. Barnsley, UK: Seaforth Publishing. .

 

Ships of the line of the Royal Navy
1700s ships